Ghost Ranch is a  retreat and education center located close to the village of Abiquiú in Rio Arriba County in north central New Mexico, United States. It was the home and studio of Georgia O'Keeffe, as well as the subject of many of her paintings.

Ghost Ranch is also known for a remarkable concentration of fossils, most notably that of the theropod dinosaur Coelophysis, of which it has been estimated that nearly a thousand individuals have been preserved in a quarry at Ghost Ranch.

History
Ghost Ranch is part of Piedra Lumbre (Spanish, "Shining Rock"), a 1766 land grant to Pedro Martin Serrano from Charles III of Spain. The Rito del Yeso is a stream that meanders through the canyons and gorge, providing a drought-resistant source of water for life to thrive. In 1976, Ghost Ranch was designated as a National Natural Landmark by the National Park Service.

The canyon was first inhabited by the Archuleta brothers, cattle rustlers who enjoyed the coverage and invisibility that the canyon provided as well as their ability to see for miles down the valley. They created two jacal homes and would move stolen cattle throughout the night to Box Canyon. By transporting the cattle through streams, footprints would be lost and they could not be tracked. Stories of people staying with the Archuleta brothers who had gone missing (and their clothing on the men) circulated around the area. One day one of the brothers made a transaction without the other, and claimed he had buried the gold for safety. The second brother killed him, and kept his wife and daughter hostage until they admitted to knowing where the gold was hidden. Although the mother and daughter feared the rumored spirits of the canyon, they mustered up the courage to sneak away at night through the Chama Valley. A group of local men then came to the ranch, fighting through their fear, and hanged the remaining brother and his gang from a cottonwood tree that still stands next to one of the casitas on the property. Other visitors who stayed in the casita later on noted that they could hear voices of a man and a woman fighting.

Arthur Pack
Roy Pfaffle won the deed to the ranch in a poker game sometime early in 1928. His wife, Carol Stanley, recorded the deed in her name, decided to name the place Ghost Ranch, and moved there two years later, after divorcing Pfaffle. Stanley constructed guest quarters and created an exclusive dude ranch that was visited by many of the wealthy and creative people of the time. Eventually many of her friends moved to New Mexico for its peaceful atmosphere. One of the most influential people to visit Ghost Ranch was Arthur Newton Pack, writer and editor of Nature Magazine. Arthur's daughter suffered from bouts of pneumonia, so he and his family had to move to an area with a drier climate, and he came to Stanley's ranch. Although her clientele were wealthy, Stanley was having trouble breaking even; she sold the ranch to Arthur Pack in 1935.

As Arthur Pack aged, he began to take concern in how the ranch would be passed on. He spoke with the YMCA, the Boy Scouts of America, the Archdiocese of Santa Fe, and the United Brethren Church about having and maintaining the ranch. But none of these organizations were in a position to accept the offer. Then, the Presbyterians accepted the offer of using the space as an educational facility, though it would be difficult for them to develop. Now, the ranch is used as an educational and retreat center, where over 300 classes are offered each year.

Georgia O'Keeffe
Georgia O'Keeffe, intrigued by Arthur Pack's statement that the Piedra Lumbre was "the best place in the world", visited the ranch and fell in love with the geography. Soon thereafter, she split her time between New York and New Mexico. She enjoyed having alone time, and was often very demanding of the Packs. Cerro Pedernal was a key geographical feature that could be often found in her paintings.

2015 flash flood
On July 7, 2015, a flash flood occurred in Ghost Ranch due to severe weather that destroyed several buildings at the ranch. No injuries or deaths were caused by the flood.

Geology and palaeontology
200 million years ago Ghost Ranch and the American Southwest were located close to the equator, and had a warm, monsoon-like climate with heavy seasonal precipitation.  Ghost Ranch includes a famous palaeontological site preserving Triassic dinosaurs.  Fossil bones were found here as early as 1885.  In 1947 the palaeontologist Edwin H. Colbert documented the discovery of over a thousand well-preserved fossilized skeletons of a small Triassic dinosaur called Coelophysis in a quarry here.  In 2007, fossil remains of Dromomeron romeri, one of the group of animals recognized as basal dinosauromorphs, were found in the Hayden Quarry.<ref>Herrmann, Andrew. - "Grad student finds 'pre-dinosaur' - Part of team to discover 210 million-year-old species in N.M.". - Chicago Sun-Times. - July 20, 2007.  — Mullen, William. - "Fossil prompts new dinosaur theory - Discovery is changing conventional wisdom on how quickly beasts came to rule Earth". - Chicago Tribune. - July 20, 2007.  — Gerber, Marty. - "Fossils Show Dinosaurs Coexisted with ancestors". - Santa Fe New Mexican. - July 20, 2007.</ref>  In April 2010, a team of scientists led by Hans-Dieter Sues of the Smithsonian Institution reported the discovery of Daemonosaurus chauliodus, a basal theropod species, at Ghost Ranch.   Daemonosaurus lived approximately 205 million years ago, during a transitional period between the oldest known dinosaurs such as Herrerasaurus, which existed during the Late Triassic period in what is now known as Argentina and Brazil, and the more advanced theropod dinosaurs.

Cinematography
Ghost Ranch's redrock scenery and  have attracted many filmmakers.  Here is a partial list of films and series shot at Ghost Ranch:

 The Light That Failed (1939)
 And Now Miguel (1966) included Ghost Ranch staff members James Hall and Heil Waters in small roles.
 Showdown (1973)
 Red Dawn (1984)
 Silverado (1985)
 Outrageous Fortune (1987)
 City Slickers (1991)
 The Last Outlaw (1993 TV movie)
 Earth 2 (1994 TV series)
 Wyatt Earp (1994)
 Wild Wild West (1999)
 All the Pretty Horses (2000)
 The Missing (2003)
 No Country for Old Men (2007)
 3:10 to Yuma (2007)
 Indiana Jones and the Kingdom of the Crystal Skull (2008)
 Georgia O'Keeffe (2009 TV movie)
 Year One (2009)
 Brothers (2009)
 Cowboys & Aliens (2011)
 Lone Ranger (2013)
 Cosmos: A Spacetime Odyssey (2014)
 The Ballad of Buster Scruggs'' (2018 Netflix movie)

See also
 Effigia

References

External links

Presbyterian Church (USA)
National Natural Landmarks in New Mexico
Geography of Rio Arriba County, New Mexico
Buildings and structures in Rio Arriba County, New Mexico
Museums in Rio Arriba County, New Mexico
Natural history museums in New Mexico
Dinosaur museums in the United States
Anthropology museums in the United States
History museums in New Mexico
Art museums and galleries in New Mexico
Education in Rio Arriba County, New Mexico
Ranches in New Mexico